The Giro Toscana Int. Femminile – Memorial Michela Fanini is annual elite women's road bicycle racing stage race held in Italy since 1995.

During the 2013 race, 63 of the 112 riders refused to compete in the fourth and final stage of the race due to safety concerns, including having to race in open car traffic without sufficient police protection. After briefly listening to the riders' complaints at a meeting before the fourth stage, the organizer, Brunello Fanani, told the protesting riders and team representatives to "go home." Among the protesting riders were Italy's two top women's riders, Elisa Longo Borghini and Giorgia Bronzini, and Marianne Vos, the overall leader after the third stage. The race returned in 2014 but was reduced to two stages plus a prologue time trial, and its UCI race classification was downgraded from 2.1 to 2.2.

Past winners

References

External links
 

 
Cycle races in Italy
Recurring sporting events established in 1995
1995 establishments in Italy
Women's road bicycle races